The alpha/beta hydrolase superfamily is a superfamily of hydrolytic enzymes of widely differing phylogenetic origin and catalytic function that share a common fold. The core of each enzyme is an alpha/beta-sheet (rather than a barrel), containing 8 beta strands connected by 6 alpha helices. The enzymes are believed to have diverged from a common ancestor, retaining little obvious sequence similarity, but preserving the arrangement of the catalytic residues. All have a catalytic triad, the elements of which are borne on loops, which are the best-conserved structural features of the fold.

The alpha/beta hydrolase fold includes proteases, lipases, peroxidases, esterases, epoxide hydrolases and dehalogenases.

Database
The ESTHER database provides a large collection of information about this superfamily of proteins.

Subfamilies 
3-oxoadipate enol-lactonase

Human proteins containing this domain 
ABHD10; ABHD11; ABHD12; ABHD12B; ABHD13; ABHD2; ABHD3; ABHD4;
ABHD5; ABHD6; ABHD7; ABHD8; ABHD9; BAT5; BPHL; C20orf135;
EPHX1; EPHX2; FAM108B1; LIPA; LIPF; LIPJ; LIPK; LIPM;
LIPN; LYPLAL1; MEST; MGLL; PPME1; SERHL; SERHL2; SPG21; CES1; CES2; C4orf29

See also
Ecdysteroid-phosphate phosphatase - structure of a steroid phosphate phosphotase
Serine hydrolase - an enzyme family that is composed largely of proteins with alpha-beta hydrolase folds

External links
 The ESTHER database

References 

Protein domains
Peripheral membrane proteins
Hydrolases
Protein superfamilies